Batteries Not Included is a 1987 film by  Matthew Robbins. 

The term may also refer to:

 Batteries Not Included (TV series), a short-running British TV series
 Batteries Not Included (album), a 1982 After the Fire album